Bohdan Fedorovych Boyko (born 29 September 1954) was a candidate in 2004 Ukrainian presidential election. He was nominated by the Movement of Ukrainian Patriots. In 2000, he formed a third Rukh within the Popular Movement of Ukraine aimed at reconciling the differences between the two opposing factions. Before 2002 he was a national deputy of Ukraine. Since 2002 he has been chair of the People's Movement of Ukraine for Unity, which is one of the branches of former People's Movement of Ukraine of Vyacheslav Chornovil. He has never been a member of the Communist Party of the Soviet Union.

Biography 
He was born on September 29, 1954 in the village of Pidyarkiv, Peremyshlyany district, Lviv region, USSR.

Education 

 Ivan Franko Lviv State University, Faculty of Economics (1971—1976), economist;
 graduate student at the Department of Political Economy, Lviv University (1979—1982);
 Candidate's dissertation "Efficiency of commodity turnover of means of production in the period of developed socialism" (1982).

Career 
1982—1986 — Assistant Professor of Political Economy, Lviv Agricultural Institute.

1986—1990 — Art. Lecturer, Department of Philosophy and Political Economy, Ternopil Pedagogical Institute.

From 1990 — 1st Deputy Chairman of the Executive Committee, Ternopil Regional Council of People's Deputies.

Since January 15, 1992 — Chairman of the Executive Committee and Regional Council.

April 1992 — June 1994 — Chairman, Ternopil Regional Council of People's Deputies.

September 7, 1996 — April 20, 1998 — Head of the Ternopil Regional State Administration.

Since 1990 — co-chairman, chairman of the Ternopil regional council of the Movement.

1993 — co-chairman of the Ternopil Regional Council of the Movement.

1995—1999 — Deputy Chairman of the NRU.

1995—1997 — c. at. Chairman, Chairman of the NRU Secretariat.

References 

Living people
1954 births
People from Lviv Oblast
University of Lviv alumni
First convocation members of the Verkhovna Rada
Second convocation members of the Verkhovna Rada
Third convocation members of the Verkhovna Rada
People's Movement of Ukraine politicians
Candidates in the 2004 Ukrainian presidential election
Governors of Ternopil Oblast